Novikovo is a rural locality (a selo) in Starooskolsky District, Belgorod Oblast, Russia. The population was 51 as of 2010. There are 2 streets.

Geography 
Novikovo is located 21 km south of Stary Oskol (the district's administrative centre) by road. Pesochny is the nearest rural locality.

References 

Rural localities in Starooskolsky District